Bunnoe a townland in the Parish of Drung, part of the Barony of Tullygarvey and in the Diocese of Kilmore in the County Cavan. It also gives its name to the area in the northern part of the Roman Catholic part of the Parish of Drung. The townland gives its name to the Bunnoe River, which rises in County Monaghan and winds its way down to Bunnoe where it flows into the Annalee. The river is a well known trout fishery and the Bunnoe and District Angling Club take great care of the river keeping it well stocked.

St Mary's Church Bunnoe
There was a long clay cabin, known as Bunnoe chapel, built in 1780 in the townland of Lisboduff. The present church was being built in 1839 when it was damaged by the big wind. It was completed in 1843.

References

Townlands of County Cavan